Microcobitis is a genus of freshwater fish in the family Cobitidae. It contains the sole species Microcobitis misgurnoides which is endemic to Vietnam.

References

Cobitidae
Monotypic fish genera
Fish of Asia